The Automobile Thieves is an American crime-drama silent film directed by J. Stuart Blackton. The picture stars Blackton and Florence Lawrence. It was released on November 10, 1906 by The American Vitagraph Company; a print of the feature is preserved in the UCLA Film and Television Archive.

Synopsis
Synopsis by Vitagraph in The New York Clipper (November 1906)
The Thieves' Den - Plotting a big strike - Two of the gang hired as Lady's Maid and Chauffeur by millionaire victim - Robbery, murder, safe blowing and escape in stolen auto - Holdup of auto parties on the highway and sensational robbery of jewels and money while running side by side with another automobile - Police Headquarters - Detectives starting out to trace the criminals - Following the clue - laying a trap - Not yet, but soon, a narrow escape - Desperate pursuit, a race for life and liberty between two fast and powerful cars - Breakdown of the auto thieve's machine, theft of another car - chase continued - surrounded but not surrendered - automobile explodes, bursts into flames and is entirely destroyed - the woman and her pal retreat, fighting desperately - she is wounded, and the man carries her to the den, where after a furious battle with the police, the gang is captured.

Cast
J. Stuart Blackton - Male robber
Florence Lawrence - Female accomplice

Background
In an advertisement in The New York Clipper, dated 1906, Vitagraph proclaimed that there was a "destruction by fire of a $2,000 automobile" and the picture was "founded on fact - startling in conception and execution - daringly realistic in plot and climax...not cheap, trashy, dime-novel melodrama, but a cleverly constructed, superbly acted production capable of holding the attention of intelligent, up-to-date audience".

This was Florence Lawrence's first movie; she went on to star in more Vitagraph films, but her real name never appeared on the credits. She later went to work with Biograph Studios and after marrying Harry Solter, she moved to Independent Moving Pictures Company of America (IMP). It was at Independent where Lawrence achieved her first real success with The Broken Oath. As a result of her new found popularity, she earned the nickname - "The First Movie Star". She has also been referred to as - "The Vitagraph Girl", "The Biograph Girl" and after her move to Independent, "The Imp Girl". Lawrence went on to make over 300 films in her career.

References

External links

1906 films
1906 short films
American silent short films
Vitagraph Studios short films
American black-and-white films
Films directed by J. Stuart Blackton
1900s crime drama films
American crime drama films
1900s American films
Silent American drama films